Exocentrus adspersus is a species of longhorn beetles of the subfamily Lamiinae. It was described by Mulsant in 1846, and is known from Europe, the Caucasus, and Russia. The beetles inhabit various deciduous trees, although their preferred host plants are oaks.

References

Beetles described in 1846
Beetles of Europe
Acanthocinini